The following things have been named after Rabindranath Tagore, Bengali poet, writer, composer, philosopher and painter.

Awards and prizes

 Rabindranath Tagore Literary Prize
 Tagore Award
 Rabindra Puraskar
 Tagore Ratna and Tagore Puraskar

Festivals
 Rabindra Jayanti
 Tagore International Literature and Arts Festival

Universities and institutes
 Rabindra Bharati University, Kolkata, India.
 Rabindranath Tagore Medical College
 Rabindranath Tagore International Institute of Cardiac Sciences, Kolkata, India
 Rabindra University, Sahjadpur, Shirajganj, Bangladesh.
 Rabindranath Tagore University, Hojai, Assam, India
 Rabindra Maitree University, Courtpara, Kushtia, Bangladesh.
 Rabindra Srijonkala University, Keraniganj, Dhaka, Bangladesh
 Rabindranath Thakur Mahavidyalaya, Tripura, India
 Rabindra Mahavidyalaya
 Tagore Government College of Education
 Tagore International School
 West Bengal Council of Rabindra Open Schooling
 Dum Dum Motijheel Rabindra Mahavidyalaya
 Rathindra Krishi Vigyan Kendra, Visva Bharati 
 Rabindranath Tagore Secondary School, Mauritius
 Tagore Baal Niketan Sr. Sec. School, Karnal
 Tagore Vidyaniketan, Taliparamba

Buildings
 Tagore Theatre
  Rabindranath Tagore Memorial Auditorium, Sri Lanka 
 Rabindra Parishad
 Rabindra Tirtha
 Bishwakabi Rabindranath Tagore Hall, Jahangirnagar University, Bangladesh
 Rabindra Nazrul Art Building, Arts Faculty, Islamic University, Bangladesh
 Rabindra Library (Central), Assam University, India
 Ravindra Bharathi, Hyderabad 
 Ravindra Kalakshetra, Bangalore 
 Rabindra Sadan, Kolkata

Bridge
 Rabindra Setu, Kolkata

Places
 Rabindra Sarobar
 Tagore Hill
 Tagore Garden metro station
 Tagoretown
 R. T. Nagar
 Thakurova, Prague
 Rehov Tagore, Tel Aviv, Israel

Museums
 Rabindra Bharati Museum, at Jorasanko Thakur Bari, Kolkata, India 
 Tagore Memorial Museum, at Shilaidaha Kuthibadi, Shilaidaha, Bangladesh 
 Rabindra Memorial Museum at Shahzadpur Kachharibari, Shahzadpur, Bangladesh 
 Rabindra Bhavan Museum, in Santiniketan, India 
 Rabindra Museum, in Mungpoo, near Kalimpong, India 
 Patisar Rabindra Kacharibari, Patisar, Atrai, Naogaon, Bangladesh 
 Pithavoge Rabindra Memorial Complex, Pithavoge, Rupsha, Khulna, Bangladesh 
 Rabindra Complex, Dakkhindihi village, Phultala Upazila, Khulna, Bangladesh

Species
 Barapasaurus tagorei

See also
 List of things named after Mahatma Gandhi
 List of things named after Rajiv Gandhi
 List of things named after Indira Gandhi
 List of things named after Jawaharlal Nehru
 List of things named after B. R. Ambedkar

References

Memorials to Rabindranath Tagore
Tagore, Rabindranath